Amy Elizabeth Steadman (born September 8, 1984) is an American former soccer player who played as a defender, making four appearances for the United States women's national team.

Career
In high school, she played for the Brevard Blue Devils, where she was rated by Soccer America as the third-best high school soccer prospect in the U.S. She was also selected as a Parade and NSCAA High-School All-American in 2001 and 2002. She also ran track for two seasons, winning the WAC Conference Runner award and state 400 metres in 2001, and participated in swimming for one year at Brevard. She played youth club soccer for the Greensboro Twisters and the Atlanta Lightning, winning the under-19 national championship with the latter. In college, Steadman played for the North Carolina Tar Heels from 2003 to 2004, where she was a letter-winner. She enrolled at UNC a year-and-a-half prior to her scheduled high school graduation, though she had to redshirt during the 2002 season to recover from a torn ACL. The 2003 season, which saw Carolina win the 2003 NCAA Division I Women's Soccer Tournament, was ended early for Steadman after she again tore her ACL. In February 2005, extensive damage was revealed on her knee when undergoing a fifth surgery in three-and-a-half years, revealing she had played the previous season without an ACL and had no meniscus. Shortly after, she decided to give up her athletic career entirely. In total, she scored 3 goals and recorded 2 assists in 37 appearances for the Tar Heels.

Steadman was part of the U.S. under-19 squad that won the 2002 FIFA U-19 Women's World Championship in Canada, though she tore her ACL during the tournament. She also played for the under-21 national team. She made her international debut for the United States on March 11, 2001 in the 2001 Algarve Cup against Canada. In total, she made four appearances for the U.S., earning her final cap on March 17, 2001 in the Algarve Cup against Norway.

Personal life
Steadman is a native of Brevard, North Carolina. She serves as the vice president of media strategy and business development for the National Football League.

Career statistics

International

Honors
United States U19
FIFA U-19 Women's World Championship: 2002

References

External links
 

1984 births
Living people
People from Brevard, North Carolina
Soccer players from North Carolina
American women's soccer players
United States women's international soccer players
Women's association football defenders
North Carolina Tar Heels women's soccer players